Sophie Karen Alper (September 12, 1902 – January 22, 1996) was a Russian Empire born American psychologist better known as Karen Machover.

Early life and education 
Sophie Karen Alper was born on September 12, 1902 in Minsk in the Russian Empire. She migrated to the Lower East Side of Manhattan, New York City with her parents in 1910. Both her parents died by the time she was 8 years old. With little assistance from relatives, she was self-supporting by the age of 12. She graduated from elementary school with honors at the age of 12 and completed a high school equivalency. She earned a bachelor of arts from New York University in 1929 and a master of arts from the New York University School of Education. She conducted doctoral studies at Columbia University in the mid-1930s but never completed the degree.

Career 
As a young clinician at Bellevue Hospital, Machover (then: Karen Alper) collaborated with other Marxist activists to found the Psychologists League. It was a Popular Front group with liberal, socialist and communist members that agitated for jobs and better treatment for psychologists 

Late in her career, Machover embraced feminism and rejected Freudian Theory which she had previously embraced.

Personal life 
Alper married Solomon Machover in 1936. Together, they had one son, Robert Machover.

Publications

 Personality Projection In The Drawing Of The Human Figure (A Method of Personality Investigation). CHARLES C. THOMAS • PUBLISHER. First Edition, First Printing, 1949; First Edition, Second Printing, 1950 Internet Archive Aces. aug. 2019

See also
Psychologists League

References

1902 births
1996 deaths
American women psychologists
20th-century American psychologists
Emigrants from the Russian Empire to the United States
People from the Lower East Side
Scientists from New York City
Steinhardt School of Culture, Education, and Human Development alumni
American feminists
20th-century American women